The 1912–13 Magyar Kupa (English: Hungarian Cup) was the 4th season of Hungary's annual knock-out cup football competition.

Final

See also
 1912–13 Nemzeti Bajnokság I

References

External links
 Official site 
 soccerway.com

1912–13 in Hungarian football
1912–13 domestic association football cups
1912-13